Radoslav Lukaev (Bulgarian: Радослав Лукаев) (born 24 April 1982) is a former professional tennis player from Bulgaria.

Lukaev made it into his first Grand Slam event at the 2002 US Open, with wins over Éric Prodon, Jaroslav Levinský and Peter Luczak in the qualifiers. He met Russian Nikolay Davydenko in the first round and lost in four sets.

He played five Davis Cup ties for Bulgaria, winning seven of his 12 matches, with a 4–3 record in singles and 3–2 record in doubles. In 2005 he was called upon to play the fifth and deciding rubber against Finland's Tuomas Ketola and came out on top, in straight sets.

Year-end rankings

Challenger and Futures finals

Singles: 5 (4–1)

Doubles: 10 (3–7)

 w/o = Walkover

Davis Cup 
Radoslav Lukaev debuted for the Bulgaria Davis Cup team in 2000. Since then he has 5 nominations with 5 ties played, his singles W/L record is 4–3 and doubles W/L record is 3–2 (7–5 overall).

Singles (4–3)

Doubles (3–2) 

RPO = Relegation Play-off

References

External links
 
 
 

1982 births
Living people
Bulgarian male tennis players
Sportspeople from Burgas
Bulgarian expatriate sportspeople in the United States
21st-century Bulgarian people